Weaver is a ghost town in Douglas County, Kansas, United States.

History
A post office called Weaver was established in 1891, and remained in operation until 1903. The Weaver community was located close to the southern bank of the Kansas River. The area lies in a region called "Weaver Bottoms," which is in the Kansas River floodplain. Therefore, the community was the victim of frequent flooding. Floods in 1903 and 1908 significantly damaged the community. The Great Flood of 1951 destroyed every remnant of the community, and forced all residents to leave the community permanently. No trace of Weaver exists as of 2021.

References

Further reading

External links
 Douglas County Maps: Current, Historic, KDOT

Unincorporated communities in Douglas County, Kansas
Unincorporated communities in Kansas